Åh vad jag älskade dig just då is a 1998 studio album from Swedish dansband Lotta Engbergs. The album reached the 22nd place on the Swedish album chart.

Track listing

References 

1998 albums